CERL may refer to:

 the Central Electricity Research Laboratories of the British post-war electric power industry
 the Consortium of European Research Libraries
 the Computer-based Education Research Laboratory of the University of Illinois at Urbana–Champaign
 the Construction Engineering Research Laboratory within the Engineer Research and Development Center of the US Army Corps of Engineers